Rainbow Beach is a coastal rural town and locality in the Gympie Region, Queensland, Australia.

It is a popular tourist destination, both in its own right and as a gateway to Fraser Island, with a vehicle ferry frequently running to the Southern point of Fraser Island.

Geography 
Rainbow Beach is bounded to the east by Wide Bay in the Coral Sea.

The town's name derives from the rainbow-coloured sand dunes surrounding the settlement. According to the legends of the Kabi people, the dunes were coloured when Yiningie, a spirit represented by a rainbow, plunged into the cliffs after doing battle with an evil tribesman. Much of the sand colours stem from the rich content of minerals in the sand, such as rutile, ilmenite, zircon, and monazite. A black dune of ilmenite sands, overgrown by dune vegetation, can be found north west of the main town. This is currently being removed for sale in China with complete removal expected to take two years.

The Cooloola Section of the Great Sandy National Park borders the town to the south. A number of walking tracks through the national park depart from the southern outskirts of Rainbow Beach. This includes the northern end point of the Cooloola Great Walk.

History

The town's war memorial commemorating those who died in the World War I and subsequent conflicts was refurbished in 1993 and is also located in Laurie Hanson Park.

Rainbow Beach State School opened on 28 January 1986.

The Anglican Church of the Good Shepherd opened on 15 September 1993. The church and hall were relocated from Yeronga in Brisbane in a 15-hour journey and re-erected in Rainbow Beach. The church had operated in Yeronga under the same name from 1958 to 1992.

Rainbow Beach Library was opened in 2012.

Economy 
The town's economy is now dominated by tourism, featuring quiet and idyllic holidays, fishing and retirement getaway. The town caters to beach-orientated holiday-makers with hotels, motels, and caravan parks. The town promotes itself as the "Gateway to Fraser Island" as vehicular ferries for Fraser Island depart from Inskip Point, north of town. Double Island Point, a popular destination amongst 4WD enthusiasts, is located east of town. It is also promoted as an eco-tourism destination.

Although it has a permanent population of about 1,000, about 70,000 visitors come to the town each year.

Community Facilities 
Gympie Regional Council operates Rainbow Beach Library at Rainbow Beach Community Hall, 32 Rainbow Beach Road.

The Anglican Church of the Good Shepherd is at 17-19 Carlo Street.

St Peter the Fisherman Catholic Church is at the south-east end of Manooka Drive.

Education 
Rainbow Beach State School is a government primary (Prep-6) school for boys and girls at Warooga Road. In 2017, the school had an enrolment of 93 students with 8 teachers (6 full-time equivalent) and 5 non-teaching staff (4 full-time equivalent).

References

External links

 
 Town map of Rainbow Beach, 1983

Towns in Queensland
Coastal towns in Queensland
Beaches of Queensland
Gympie Region
1969 establishments in Australia
Populated places established in 1969
Localities in Queensland